Nicolaas van Hoorn (25 August 1904 – 17 June 1946) was a Dutch fencer. He competed in the individual and team épée events at the 1936 Summer Olympics.

References

External links
 

1904 births
1946 deaths
Dutch male épée fencers
Olympic fencers of the Netherlands
Fencers at the 1936 Summer Olympics
Sportspeople from Rotterdam
20th-century Dutch people